Hordeum murinum, commonly known as wall barley or false barley, is a species of grass, and a close relative of cultivated barley (Hordeum vulgare).

Overview
Hordeum murinum is quite widespread and common. It flowers during May through July in mainly coastal areas. In the British Isles it is absent throughout most of Ireland and Scotland but is common in England and Wales.

It can grow to 30 cm in height, and its unbranched spikes can reach 10 cm long. It produces small, dry nutlets and its leaves can be 8 mm wide with short, blunt ligules.

It is an annual winter species whose seeds germinate and develop in the spring. It is also referred to as wall barley and are tetraploids. It is distinct from other species of the genus because of its morphology and molecular genetics. It is also distinct because of the barriers it has with the Hordeum taxa when it comes to its ability to cross with other species.

Among its subspecies is included H. m. ssp. leporinum, known as hare barley.

Growth requirements
Hordeum murinum complex is the most widespread of all the other Hordeum species. The center of distribution of H. murinum is in the Mediterranean area, Central Europe, Western Asia, and North Africa. A greater quantity of dry material is produced with medium precipitation and better distribution. Precipitation is the most important factor in the production of seeds for this species. In the years that are more dry with early or late rainfalls, there is no chance of re-seeding for this species. The species uses a greater part of its reproductive resources for seed production, allowing it to adapt to different water conditions. Controlling the seeding rate favors high-quality strand of barley. The sowing rate for wall barley increases when seed production and forage increases. This helps to obtain ideal and sustainable forage and seed yield in rangelands of Jordan. The height of the plant and protein content does not respond to seeding rates, but the height of the plant and protein content does vary with years. Anatomical characteristics of leaf blades differ between the taxa. This weedy species along with hare barley and smooth barley can be hard to control.

Subspecies
One subspecies is Hordeum murinum ssp. leporinum, known as hare barley, mouse barley, and barley grass. It is native to the Mediterranean region near continental, oceanic, and colder climates, as well as northern Africa and temperate Asia, and it is widely naturalised elsewhere. It was first published as the full species H. leporinum by Johann Heinrich Friedrich Link in 1834. In 1882 it was redescribed as a subspecies of H. murinum by Giovanni Arcangeli, though today some authorities maintain it at the species level.

Another subspecies is H. m. ssp. glaucum. It appears in warmer climates of the Mediterranean region.

The above subspecies differ primarily because of their chromosome numbers, spikelet morphology, and geographical distribution.

Within Hordeum, there are 2 subgenera and 4 sections with 4 different genotypes. The clade that is the sister taxon to H. murinum is H. bulbosum and H. vulgare.

Uses
Although H. murinum is considered a difficult weed in cereal crop fields, it is useful for feeding grazing animals. It is also the main source of forage for cattle production in areas with water deficits.

Cultural significance
In England in the late 20th century among children the plant was referred to colloquially as the 'Flea Dart', from the aerodynamic shape of its seedhead, and the aphids that are often present within it in its immature state. In China the subspecies leporinum is a common ingredient in the spring Qingming Festival snack qīngtuán.

References 

murinum
Bunchgrasses of Europe
Flora of France
Flora of Italy
Flora of the United Kingdom
Plants described in 1753
Taxa named by Carl Linnaeus
Flora of Malta